The following highways are numbered 1806:

United States
 North Dakota Highway 1806
 South Dakota Highway 1806
 Farm to Market Road 1806